DD Tripura is a state-owned television channel owned by Doordarshan, serving the Indian state of Tripura. It was formerly known as Doordarshan Kendra Agartala until 21 January 2021, when it was renamed to its current name. It also commenced full day broadcasts that day. DD Tripura channel also available on DD Free dish's Channel Number 83.

Political Conflict 

The Agartala unit of the Doordarshan refuted Tripura Chief Minister’s Office claim that CM Manik Sarkar’s speech was blacked out on Independence Day.

See also
 List of programs broadcast by DD National
 All India Radio
 Ministry of Information and Broadcasting
 DD Direct Plus
 List of South Asian television channels by country

References

External links
 Doordarshan Official Internet site
 Doordarshan news site
 An article at PFC

Doordarshan
Mass media in Tripura
Foreign television channels broadcasting in the United Kingdom
Television channels and stations established in 1992
Direct broadcast satellite services
Indian direct broadcast satellite services
1992 establishments in Tripura